PN Review is a periodic publication in the United Kingdom, in the subject of poetry. Each issue includes an editorial, letters, news and notes, articles, interviews, features, poems, translations, and a substantial book review section. It is indexed by the Modern Language Association.

In 1973, PN Review launched as a twice-yearly hardback under the title Poetry Nation, founded by Michael Schmidt and Professor Brian Cox at the Victoria University of Manchester. It began being published quarterly in 1976 as an A4 paperback. At this time, the title changed to PN Review, and Cox and Schmidt were joined on the editorial board by Professor Donald Davie and C. H. Sisson. Brian Cox retired, followed some years later by Donald Davie and C.H. Sisson. Since 1981, it has been published six times per year. Two hundred and twenty-five issues of the magazine appeared as of the September–October 2015 number.

External links 
PN Review website

1973 establishments in the United Kingdom
Biannual magazines published in the United Kingdom
Literary magazines published in the United Kingdom
Magazines established in 1973
Magazines published in Manchester
Poetry magazines published in the United Kingdom
Quarterly magazines published in the United Kingdom